Vincent Raymond Reinhart (born August 20, 1957) is the Chief Economist for BNY Mellon Asset Management.

Early career
Reinhart received a B.S. from Fordham University, a M.Phil. and M.A. from Columbia University. He held several positions in the Federal Reserve Bank of New York in the 1980s, numerous senior positions in the Divisions of Monetary Affairs and International Finance in the 1990s and during the last six years of his career in the Federal Reserve as secretary and economist of the Federal Open Market Committee. From 2011 to 2015, Reinhart was the Chief US Economist at Morgan Stanley. He joined Standish Asset Management, the fixed income boutique for BNY Mellon Investment Management, as Chief Economist in March 2016.

Research and publication
Reinhart's work covers various topics of domestic and international monetary policy, such as economic bubbles, auctions of U.S. Treasury securities, alternative strategies for monetary policy and the efficient communication of monetary policy decisions, and the financial crisis of 2007–2010. He has published in scholarly journals such as the American Economic Review, International Journal of Finance and Economics, Journal of Macroeconomics, Journal of Money, and Credit and Banking, among others. In the financial press, his work is often cited or carried, including in Bloomberg L.P., The New York Times, The Washington Post and The Wall Street Journal.

Personal information
He was born in New York City, United States, and is married to Harvard University economist Carmen Reinhart, who was a classmate in graduate school at Columbia University. They have one child, William Raymond.

References

External links
 
 

21st-century American economists
Monetary economists
1957 births
Living people
Fordham University alumni
Columbia University alumni